Shibu Chakravarthy is an Indian lyricist, screenwriter, and poster designer who works in Malayalam cinema. His ancestors were the rulers of Kurukkanmoola Dynasty, hence the name Chakravarthy. His birthname was Shibu Rajav, later changed to Shibu Chakravarthy by publishing in gazette.

Career 
He was introduced to the Malayalam film industry by Rajan Prakash of Prakash Movie tone.  His first film was Allimalarkkavu (1984), made while he was doing his master's degree in philosophy in Maharaja's College, Ernakulam. He continued his studies and secured a diploma in journalism while working in the film industry. His breakthrough was the film Shyama with the song "Chembarathy Poove chollu", and became a lyricist. 

Besides being a lyricists and screenwriter, he has also worked as a graphic designer with Gayathri Asokan at Gayathri designs. He had then worked on poster designs for many Malayalam movies and cover designs for music cassettes.

He has worked with M.K. Arjunan, Raghu Kumar, Shyam, Ravindran, Johnson, K.J. Joy, Kannoor Rajan, Jerry Amal Dev, M.G. Radhakrishnan, S.P. Venketesh, Mohan Sithara, M. Jayachandran Alphons, Deepak Dev, and Ousephachan.

As script writer

Manu Uncle, directed by Dennis Joseph
Adharvam, directed by Dennis Joseph
Nair Saab (as co-writer with Dennis Joseph), directed by Joshiy
Samrajyam, directed by Jomon
Abhayam, directed by Sivan
Ezharakoottam, directed by Karim.
 Parvathy Parinayam directed by P. G. Viswambharan
Churam, directed by Bharathan                                           
 Sainyam - directed by Joshi

References

External links

 Shibu Chakravarthy at the Malayalam Movie Database

1961 births
Living people
Malayalam screenwriters
Indian male screenwriters
Screenwriters from Kerala
Maharaja's College, Ernakulam alumni
20th-century Indian dramatists and playwrights
20th-century Indian male writers